Twellium Industrial Company is Ghanaian multinational beverage corporation headquartered at Nsawam in Ghana.

Establishment 
Twellium Industrial Company was established in September 2013 to manufacture, retail, and market nonalcoholic beverages. In February 2014, the company obtained the franchise from Monarch Beverage Company to produce four beverages including Rush Energy drink, Original American Cola, Planet Range and Bubble Up lemon lime.

Products and brands 
By July 2017, the Twellium Industrial Company employed a Sidel Matrix range of equipment to operate 7 production lines, producing 32000 bottles per hour. As of April 2021, Twellium Industrial Company produces Verna Natural Mineral Water, Verna Active Water, Verna Premium Water, Chale Fruit Drinks, Rush Energy Drink, Planet Drink, Run Energy Drink, Rasta Choco Malt, American Cola, Go On Energy Drink and Bigoo.

Sponsorships
Twellium Industrial Company was involved in the sponsorship of civic engagement activities, including the annual National Quran Recitation Competition in Ghana. In 2019, the company built a kindergarten block for the community school at Dzabukpo in the Central Tongu District.

References

Ghanaian companies established in 2013
Drink companies of Ghana
Eastern Region (Ghana)